An English exonym is a name in the English language for a place (a toponym), or occasionally other terms, which does not follow the local usage (the endonym). Exonyms and endonyms are features of all languages and other languages may have their own exonym for English endonyms, for example Llundain is the Welsh exonym for the English endonym "London".

Romanization, or transcription of a non-Latin alphabet endonym into a Latin alphabet, is not generally regarded as creating exonyms; "The application of any scientifically sound romanization system to a non-Roman endonym merely re-creates that original endonym in another legitimate form" (Päll, 2002). However old romanization systems may leave a legacy of "familiar" spellings, as in the case of, for example, romanization of Burmese. This affects romanization of Arabic, romanization of Chinese, and many other non-Latin alphabet place names.

Translations of non-proper nouns such as "river" and "lake" also do not qualify as exonyms.

A less common form of exonym is usage for names and titles. Personal exonyms are typically limited to regnal names such as popes (John Paul II) and monarchs (Charles V); less commonly very well known non-modern authors (John Calvin, for French Jean Calvin) are referred to by exonyms. The list does not include the list of English translated personal names.

General 
This section lists English-language exonyms that are for places located in multiple countries, English names of countries, and typical patterns.

Countries and territories 
The following is a list of countries and territories whose names in local languages differ from their (non-local) English ones. The list includes countries with limited recognition, autonomous territories of sovereign countries, and fully sovereign countries.

Country names are listed in their short form, and do not include names spelled identically in English. Near-identical names in pronunciation or spelling are included, but countries named with non-proper nouns (like Central African Republic or United Arab Emirates) are not.

The languages listed are official languages and/ or prominent local languages, except if the name for the associated country is spelled the same as in English. Languages in italics are no longer spoken in the given country, but the name listed retains some use.

Likewise, exonyms in italics are obsolete or are disputed.

Other territories 
The following is a list of other territories/regions which are not deemed as countries or sovereign states.

Specific countries

Albania

Algeria

Armenia

Australia
Several places in Australia have additional names in various Aboriginal languages.

Austria

Azerbaijan

Belgium
Historically, English borrowed French names for many places in Dutch-speaking areas of Belgium. With a few exceptions this practice is no longer followed by most sources.

Bosnia & Herzegovina

Bulgaria

Canada
Numerous places in the predominantly French speaking province of Quebec have historically had English exonyms; in most cases, the exonym was a straight translation of the place's French name, with only one major city which ever had an English exonym that was entirely different from its original French name. With a few exceptions, such as Quebec City, these are no longer widely used. Exonyms are also commonly seen with regard to First Nations and Inuit peoples and communities; although government and media sources have evolved in recent years toward using these places' native endonyms, common usage may still favour the older exonyms.

Cambodia 
During the Khmer Rogue period (1975–1979), the country was known in English as Democratic Kampuchea, closer to the endonym than its modern English exonym. The English exonym of Cambodia is based on the French exonym, Cambodge. The endonym is sometimes used in English, but the exonym is far more common.

Chile

China
Some of the apparent "exonyms" for China are the result of change in romanization of Chinese to modern pinyin, for example "Tientsin" to "Tianjin". Other apparent exonyms are the result of the English name being based on one of the other varieties of Chinese besides Mandarin. Additionally, certain names which may now be considered exonyms actually preserve older Mandarin pronunciations which have changed in the intervening centuries. For all areas in mainland China, names written in Chinese are written in simplified characters. For all areas in the special administrative regions (SARs), the names will be written in traditional characters.

Croatia

Cuba

Cyprus

Czechia
Historically, English-language sources used German names for many places in what is now the Czech Republic. With some exceptions (such as the Elbe and Oder rivers- both of which flow into Germany), this is no longer done by most sources.

The Czech government prefers the country to be referred to as Czechia in English because the country adopted it as its official short name in 2016. However, most English speakers still call the country the Czech Republic.

Denmark

Greenland
Several places were known under Danish names, or a variant of them. Now only the local Greenlandic is used.

Egypt

Estonia

Finland

France

Georgia

Germany

This list does not include German place names with ß written with "ss" or umlauts being removed in some writing.

Greece
The exonym for Greece in English comes from Magna Graecia, which was a historical region in Italy colonized by the Greeks. The endonym Ellás comes from Helen of Troy, the legendary Greek figure whose abduction caused the Greek city-states to unite and fight against Troy during the Trojan War.

Hungary

Iceland

India

Indonesia

Iran

Iraq

Ireland

The vast majority of placenames in Ireland are anglicisations, or phonetic renderings, of Irish language names. The exceptions to this are listed here:

Israel
The below listing is only a summary. Modern Israeli transcription systems (romanization of Hebrew) vary from the spellings of many hundreds of place names of Ancient Israel adopted by Bible translations - both Christian, such as the King James Version (1611) and also Jewish versions such as the JPS (1917).

Italy

Japan

Laos

Latvia

Lebanon

Libya

Lithuania

Malaysia

Mexico

Moldova

Mongolia

Morocco

Myanmar

Nepal

Netherlands

Norway

North Korea

Palestine

Philippines

Poland

Portugal

Romania

Russia

Saudi Arabia

Serbia

Slovakia

Slovenia

Somalia

South Africa
Many South African towns have multiple names due to the number of languages. Additionally, some places have been renamed from English and Afrikaans.

South Korea

Spain
English uses Spanish-language exonyms for some places in non-Spanish speaking regions of Spain.

Sri Lanka
Sri Lanka was known as Ceylon in English until 1972.

Sudan

Sweden

Switzerland

Historically, English-language sources borrowed French-language names for some places in German-speaking Switzerland. This is no longer done, and many sources now use German names for most Swiss German-speaking places.

Syria

Thailand
Thailand was known as Siam in English until the Siamese revolution of 1932.

Taiwan
The main island of Taiwan is also known in English as Formosa. All Chinese names below are written in traditional characters. As mentioned above in the China section, many place names in Taiwan use either pinyin or Wade-Giles.

Tunisia

Turkey

Ukraine

United Kingdom
The places listed are where non-English local languages are mainly used or where the non-English names don't regularly correspond to the English one.

United States 
Several places in the United States have additional names in various Native languages.

Vietnam
All cities and towns are  often spelled without diacritics; names without them are not listed here.

See also
 List of European exonyms
 List of European regions with alternative names
 List of European rivers with alternative names
 List of English exonyms for German toponyms—some no longer current
 List of renamed Indian public places—some without current acceptance

References

 
English language
English